Duncan Morton Colquhoun (24 July 1915 – 2005) was a Scottish footballer who played as a forward.

Colquhoun trialled at several Football League clubs during the mid-1930s, including Fulham, Sheffield Wednesday and Hartlepools United, but failed to make a league appearance. He was signed by Wigan Athletic from Queen of the South, and spent three seasons at the club before joining Bristol City in November 1937.

Colquhoun returned to Wigan Athletic after the Second World War.

References

1915 births
2005 deaths
Scottish footballers
Association football forwards
Fulham F.C. players
Millwall F.C. players
Dumbarton F.C. players
Sheffield Wednesday F.C. players
Hartlepool United F.C. players
Queen of the South F.C. players
Wigan Athletic F.C. players
Bristol City F.C. players
Southport F.C. players
Rochdale A.F.C. wartime guest players
Scottish Football League players
English Football League players